Sho Sasaki (佐々木 翔, born 2 October 1989) is a Japanese professional footballer of British descent who plays as a centre back for Sanfrecce Hiroshima and the Japan national team.

International career
On 30 August 2018, Sasaki received his first international callup from the Japan national football team for the Kirin Challenge Cup 2018.

Career statistics

Club
.

International

Scores and results list Japan's goal tally first, score column indicates score after each Sasaki goal.

Honours

Club
Sanfrecce Hiroshima
J.League Cup: 2022

References

External links

Profile at Sanfrecce Hiroshima

1989 births
Living people
Japanese people of British descent
Kanagawa University alumni
People from Zama, Kanagawa
Association football people from Kanagawa Prefecture
Japanese footballers
Association football defenders
Japan international footballers
2019 AFC Asian Cup players
J1 League players
J2 League players
Ventforet Kofu players
Sanfrecce Hiroshima players